The 1997 Holy Cross Crusaders football team was an American football team that represented the College of the Holy Cross during the 1997 NCAA Division I-AA football season. Holy Cross tied for second-to-last in the Patriot League.

In their second year under head coach Dan Allen, the Crusaders compiled a 4–7 record. Dominic Blue and Jeff Laboranti were the team captains.

The Crusaders were outscored 308 to 182. Holy Cross' 2–4 conference record placed it in a three-way tie for fourth in the seven-team Patriot League standings. 

The team's claimed 4–7 and 2–4 records count the season-opening Towson matchup as a Holy Cross win by forfeit, as Towson agreed in October 1997 that it had used an academically ineligible player in that game. 

Holy Cross played its home games at Fitton Field on the college campus in Worcester, Massachusetts.

Schedule

References

Holy Cross
Holy Cross Crusaders football seasons
Holy Cross Crusaders football